Mount Dzebobo is the second highest mountain in Ghana with a height of 876 meters. It is located in the Akwapim-Togo Range right on the border with Togo.

From this mountain you have a wide view of the western Volta Lake, the mountain slopes are covered with tropical rainforest and offer a wide variety of plants and animals. The mountain is located just a few kilometers south of Kyabobo National Park.

See also 
 List of national parks of Ghana

Mountains of Ghana
Oti Region